Hudson Falls (formerly Sandy Hill) is a village located in Washington County, New York, United States. The village is in the southwest of the town of Kingsbury, on U.S. Route 4. Hudson Falls is part of the Glens Falls Metropolitan Statistical Area. As of the 2010 census, the village had a population of 7,281. It was the county seat of Washington County until 1994, when the county seat was moved to Fort Edward.

History 

In 1764, Albert Baker built Kingsbury's first sawmill near what is known today as Baker's Falls. As early as 1792, the area of Kingsbury near Baker's Falls was referred to as Sandy Hill. In 1810, the hamlet incorporated as a village, keeping the name Sandy Hill. Its boundaries expanded to their current limits in the 1840s.

Around 1824, the Glens Falls Feeder Canal was constructed to bring water from the Hudson River to the Champlain Canal. With the opening of the Feeder Canal, Sandy Hill became a prosperous manufacturing center, producing lumber, paper, pianos, wagons, pulleys, and other products. The Glens Falls Feeder Canal is no longer used commercial traffic, but the route of Canal is a fourteen mile long park, with a walking & bike trail on the old tow path.

Stone quarried in Hudson Falls was used to construct the Bennington Battle Monument (1889) and the Brooklyn Bridge. The former site of the quarry has been redeveloped for use by the Washington-Saratoga-Warren-Hamilton-Essex Board of Cooperative Educational Services.

In 1851, Francis Wolle invented the first bag-making machine, and formed a company that would later become the Union Bag and Paper Company. In 1892 the company relocated from Bethlehem, Pennsylvania to Hudson Falls, where it had a paper mill. In 1906, Union Paper and Bag Co. built the Fenimore Bridge (Sandy Hill Bridge), spanning the Hudson River between Hudson Falls built in Washington County and town of Moreau in Saratoga County, since the company had plants in both locations. For a brief period of time, the closed-spandrel arch bridge was the longest multiple span, reinforced-concrete arch bridge in the world. The bridge is now closed, but local officials hope to turn it into a pedestrian walkway.

Churches
 The First Presbyterian Church of Hudson Falls was organized in 1803. Services were held in the town courthouse until a new church building was dedicated in 1827 at the site of the Old Burying Ground. This building was demolished around 1893, to make way for a larger structure, dedicated in 1895.
 Zion Episcopal was founded in 1817 as the Episcopal-Methodist Church. Services were held in a parishioner's home until a new building was completed in 1849 and consecrated as Zion Episcopal Church.  In 1968, lightning causing a fire that gutted the interior, which was then rebuilt.
 The first Catholic church between Albany and Canada was constructed in the 1830s om Wall Street. Originally called Christ Church, it was later renamed St. Mary's. That church later burnt down, and a new one was erected on Park Place.
 St. Paul's Church was founded in the 1870s to serve French Canadian in Sandy Hill. They purchased the small wooden old First Baptist Church at the top of River Street, after that congregation built a second, larger church next to the courthouse. St. Paul's erected a new, larger, brick building in the 1890s. The church was struck by lightning in 1974 and burned down. The parish subsequently merged with St. Mary's.

In 1910, the village's name was changed to Hudson Falls. The Glens Falls Feeder Canal, Hudson Falls Historic District, and United States Post Office are listed on the National Register of Historic Places.

Notable people from Hudson Falls 
William Bronk grew up in Hudson Falls. He managed a lumber business there and wrote poetry and other works, winning the National Book Award in 1982.
Townsend Harris, the United States' first consul-general to Japan, was born in Hudson Falls.
 Henry C. Martindale (1780–1860) - Attorney and Member of Congress
 Tony DeSare (1975-) - Jazz singer, pianist, and songwriter
 Gov. Nathaniel Pitcher – lived at Sandy Hill.
 Roger Skinner, member of the New York State Senate, and Judge of the United States District Court for the Northern District of New York

Historic celebrations 
In the first week of September around Friday-Saturday, there is an annual carnival to commemorate the 175th Anniversary of the founding of the Village. The "Sandy Hill Days" event is hosted at the Hudson Falls Kindergarten Center near the Knights Of Columbus (KofC), where there is also a flea market. it is also held in Juckett Park, the green in the 
center of the Village where route 4 meets with River Street.

Geography 
The total area is 2.13% water.

The village is on the east bank of the Hudson River at the western border of Washington County. A village green lies in the center of the commercial district.

NY Route 196 (Maple Street) and NY Route 254 (River Street) intersect US Route 4 in Hudson Falls.

Demographics

As of the census of 2000, there were 6,927 people, 2,876 households, and 1,760 families residing in the village. The population density was 3,763.5 people per square mile (1,453.5/km2). There were 3,120 housing units at an average density of 1,695.1 per square mile (654.7/km2). The racial makeup of the village was 97.91% White, 0.45% African American, 0.22% Native American, 0.25% Asian, 0.00% Pacific Islander, 0.16% from other races, and 1.02% from two or more races. 0.68% of the population is Hispanic or Latino of any race.

There were 2,876 households, out of which 31.4% had children under the age of 18 living with them, 40.7% were married couples living together, 15.5% had a female householder with no husband present, and 38.8% were non-families. 32.0% of all households were made up of individuals, and 13.7% had someone living alone who was 65 years of age or older. The average household size was 2.37 and the average family size was 2.95.

In the village, the population was spread out, with 25.2% under the age of 18, 8.9% from 18 to 24, 30.6% from 25 to 44, 20.6% from 45 to 64, and 14.6% who were 65 years of age or older. The median age was 36 years. For every 100 females, there were 88.5 males. For every 100 females age 18 and over, there were 83.8 males.

The median income for a household in the village was $31,516, and the median income for a family was $37,628. Males had a median income of $31,107 versus $21,215 for females. The per capita income for the village was $17,575. 17.2% of the population and 12.8% of families were below the poverty line. 30.3% of those under the age of 18 and 6.3% of those 65 and older were living below the poverty line.

Rail transportation 
Amtrak, the national passenger rail system, provides service to Hudson Falls at the station in nearby Fort Edward, operating its Adirondack daily in both directions between Montreal and New York City, and its Ethan Allen Express in both directions daily between New York City and Rutland.  Amtrak has designated the stop as Fort Edward-Glens Falls.

Freight rail service is provided along a spur line extending from Fort Edward to Glens Falls that runs through the village.

Gallery

Literary references 

The fictional town of Millers Kill, NY, in Julia Spencer-Fleming's mystery novels is loosely based on Hudson Falls.

References

External links
 Village of Hudson Falls - Official Site

Villages in New York (state)
Glens Falls metropolitan area
1810 establishments in New York (state)
Villages in Washington County, New York
New York (state) populated places on the Hudson River